

Street-side areas
Boat Quay
Bugis Village
Clarke Quay
Jalan Kayu
Peranakan Place

Shopping malls
Full article: List of shopping malls in Singapore

Housing estate commercial areas

Ang Mo Kio
Ang Mo Kio Neighbourhood 1 Centre
Ang Mo Kio Neighbourhood 3 Centre
Ang Mo Kio Neighbourhood 6 Centre
Ang Mo Kio Town Centre
Cheng San Centre
Chong Boon Centre
Kebun Baru Mall
Teck Ghee Square

Bedok
Bedok Mall
Bedok Neighbourhood 1 Centre
Bedok Neighbourhood 3 Centre
Bedok Neighbourhood 5 Centre
Bedok Neighbourhood 7 Centre
Bedok Neighbourhood 8 Centre
Bedok Town Centre
Eunos Grove

Bishan
Bishan Neighbourhood 1 Centre
Bishan North Shopping Mall
Bishan Town Centre

Bukit Batok
Bukit Batok Town Centre
Bukit Batok West Shopping Centre
Bukit Batok Neighbourhood 2 Centre
Bukit Batok Neighbourhood 3 Centre
Gombak Place
West Mall

Bukit Merah
Bukit Merah Town Centre
Telok Blangah Neighbourhood Centre
Tiong Bahru Plaza

Bukit Panjang
Bukit Panjang Town Centre
Fajar Neighbourhood Shopping Centre
Greenridge Shopping Centre

Choa Chu Kang
Choa Chu Kang Town Centre
Keat Hong Shopping Centre
Limbang Shopping Centre
Sunshine Place
Teck Whye Shopping Centre
Yew Tee Square

Clementi
Clementi Avenue 2 Shopping Centre
Clementi Neighbourhood 1 Centre
Clementi Neighbourhood 5 Centre
Clementi Neighbourhood 7 Centre
Clementi Town Centre

Geylang
Geylang East Central
Geylang Serai Centre
Joo Chiat Complex
MacPherson Central
Old Airport Road

Hougang
Central Place
Hougang Neighbourhood 1 Centre
Hougang Neighbourhood 3 Centre
Hougang Neighbourhood 6 Centre
Hougang Town Centre
Hougang Green Shopping Mall
Kovan City

Kallang
Bendemeer Shopping Mall
Kallang Basin Centre

Jurong East
IMM (Singapore)
Jurong East Neighbourhood 4 Centre
Jurong Entertainment Centre
Jurong East Regional Centre
Yuhua Place
Yuhua Village

Jurong West
Boon Lay Shopping Centre
Gek Poh Shopping Centre
Jurong West Town Centre
Jurong West Neighbourhood 4 Centre
Jurong West Neighbourhood 5 Centre
Jurong West Neighbourhood 9 Centre
Taman Jurong Neighbourhood Shopping Centre
Jurong Point
Pioneer Mall

Novena
Balestier Hill Shopping Centre

Pasir Ris
Elias Mall
Loyang Point
Pasir Ris Town Centre
Pasir Ris West Plaza
Pasir Ris Neighbourhood 4 Centre
White Sands Shopping Centre

Punggol
Punggol Town Centre
Punggol Plaza
Fernvale Point

Queenstown
Buona Vista Centre
Ghim Moh Centre
Holland Village
Mei Ling Heights
Queenstown Town Centre
Tanglin Halt Centre

Sembawang
Sembawang Town Centre

Sengkang
Rivervale Plaza
Rivervale Mall
Sengkang Town Centre

Serangoon
Serangoon North Neighbourhood Centre
Serangoon Town Centre

Simei
Simei Town Centre
EastPoint Mall

Tampines
Tampines Mart
Tampines Neighbourhood 1 Centre
Tampines Neighbourhood 2 Centre
Tampines Neighbourhood 4 Centre
Tampines Neighbourhood 8 Centre
Tampines Regional Centre
Century Square
Tampines Mall

Toa Payoh
600 @ Toa Payoh
Hersing Centre
Toa Payoh Neighbourhood 7 Centre
Toa Payoh Neighbourhood 8 Centre
Toa Payoh Town Centre

Woodlands
888 Plaza
Admiralty Place
Vista Point
Woodlands Mart
Woodlands Neighbourhood 3 Centre
Woodlands North Plaza
Woodlands Regional Centre
Woodlands Town Centre
Causeway Point

Yishun
Chong Pang City
Nee Soon East Courtyard
Yishun Central
Yishun Neighbourhood 8 Centre

Other estates
Albert Centre
Bras Basah Complex
Changi Village
Cheng Yan Court
Chinatown Complex
Crawford Centre
Hong Lim Complex
Kitchener Complex
Potong Pasir
Rochor Centre
Tanjong Pagar Plaza
Upper Aljunied
Waterloo Centre
Zhujiao Centre

Commercial sites